Pascal Arnou (born 1 August 1966) is a French weightlifter. He competed at the 1988 Summer Olympics and the 1992 Summer Olympics.

References

External links
 

1966 births
Living people
French male weightlifters
Olympic weightlifters of France
Weightlifters at the 1988 Summer Olympics
Weightlifters at the 1992 Summer Olympics
Sportspeople from Paris